Westruther is a village on the B6465, in the Scottish Borders area of Scotland, on the lower slopes of the Lammermuir Hills, in the former Berwickshire. The largest town nearby is Gordon.

Places nearby include Duns, Greenlaw, the Lammermuir Hills, Longformacus and the Watch Water Reservoir.

The ruined kirk dates from 1649 and contains the tombs of the Spottiswoode family. A prominent member of the family was Alicia Ann Spottiswoode a.k.a. Lady John Scott of "Annie Laurie" fame. There is a stained glass window in her honour in the "new" kirk dating from 1834.

Very Rev William Wilson (1808-1888) Moderator of the General Assembly of the Free Church of Scotland in 1866 was born and raised in the village.

Westruther was the name of the Spottiswoode family home, taken down between the First and Second World War.

See also
List of places in the Scottish Borders

References

External links
RCAHMS record for Westruther

Villages in the Scottish Borders
Parishes in Berwickshire